The following is a list of episodes of the TLC reality television series, Say Yes to the Dress.

Series overview

Episodes

Season 1 (2007)

Season 2 (2008)

Season 3 (2009)

Season 4 (2009)

Season 5 (2010)

Season 6 (2011)

Season 7 (2011)

Season 8 (2012)

Season 9 (2012–13)

Season 10 (2013)

Season 11 (2014)

Season 12 (2014)

Season 13 (2015)

Season 14 (2016)

Season 15 (2017)

References

Lists of American reality television series episodes